Lepyrotica is a genus of moths, belonging to the family Tineidae.

Species
Lepyrotica acantha Davis, 1994
Lepyrotica brevistrigata (Walsingham, 1897)
Lepyrotica delotoma (Meyrick, 1919)
Lepyrotica diluticornis (Walsingham, 1897) (=Tinea scythropiella Walsingham, 1897)
Lepyrotica fragilella (Walsingham, 1897)
Lepyrotica reduplicata (Walsingham, 1897)
Lepyrotica scardamyctis Meyrick, 1921

References

Tineidae
Tineidae genera
Taxa named by Edward Meyrick